Arizona State University at the West Campus is a public university in Phoenix, Arizona. It is one of five university campuses that compose Arizona State University (ASU). The West campus was established by the Arizona Legislature in 1984, and is located in northwest Phoenix, bordering the city of Glendale.

For many purposes, ASU's campuses are unified as a single institution so the West campus shares students, faculty, administration, and accreditation with the other campuses. As of fall 2009, 10,380 students were enrolled in at least one course on the West campus, while the FTE enrollment for the campus is 6,173.

In 2008, the West campus was designated as a Phoenix Point of Pride, and in 2011, construction concluded on a large solar array that powers nearly the entire campus with solar power.

History

Established as the second ASU campus in 1984, construction of the West Campus began in 1986, with the first permanent buildings completed by 1989. Originally known as "ASU West," this campus operated quasi-independently of the Tempe campus and had its own administration, faculty, and student admissions process. At the time, the west campus was designed to offer only upper-level undergraduate courses (with lower-level courses to be taken at nearby Glendale Community College). In 2001, freshmen students were admitted, allowing them to complete their entire undergraduate education on the West campus.  The academic offerings on the West campus were designed to highlight an interdisciplinary focus in the liberal arts and sciences, education, and business. With the arrival of current ASU president Michael Crow in 2002, the academic structure of ASU was reorganized to integrate the west campus into the university as a whole. Today, the West campus shares faculty, students, accreditation, and administration with the other ASU campuses.

Facilities

The West campus is the smallest of ASU's campuses in terms of facility space (square footage of buildings). The campus primarily consists of five academic buildings arranged around a quad, with a secondary quad surrounded by the campus's dormitories, dining hall, and recreation center.

In 2011, the Gary K. Herberger Young Scholars Academy, a private school for gifted children, opened on the east side of the campus. In August 2017 the school moved into a new 19,500 sq foot building near the secondary quad. The school currently uses the Cambridge Learning Curriculum and a move on when ready program. The levels range from Secondary 1 to A-Level years. Secondary 1 houses students from 10 to 14 years old. Both IGSCE years house students from 12 to 15 years old. A-Level years usually host students 16–18 years old. The Herberger Young Scholars Academy shares facilities with the rest of ASU West.

Academics

The programs offered on the West campus focus on interdisciplinary and collaborative programs in the liberal arts and sciences, education, and business, leading to bachelor's, master's and doctoral degrees. The west campus is the headquarters of ASU's New College of Interdisciplinary Arts and Sciences and Mary Lou Fulton Teachers College, and offers additional programs from the W. P. Carey School of Business. ASU's Graduate College, Honors College and University College also have an administrative presence on the campus.

See also

 List of historic properties in Phoenix, Arizona

Residence Halls
Two residential complexes are located on the west campus: Casa De Oro, a LEED Silver complex built in 2012, offers traditional dormitory-style accommodations in which students are arranged based on their academic area of study. Las Casas, built in 2002, offers apartment-style units for upper-division and graduate students.

References

External links

 Official website

Universities and colleges in Phoenix, Arizona
West campus
Arizona State University West campus
Educational institutions established in 1984
1984 establishments in Arizona
Satellite campuses